Elham (Persian: الهام) is a surname of Persian origin. Notable people with the surname include:

Gholam-Hossein Elham (born 1959), Iranian politician
Zahra Elham (born c. 2002), Afghan singer 

Surnames of Iranian origin
Surnames of Afghan origin